Leatherman Peak, at  above sea level is the second highest peak in Idaho and the Lost River Range. The peak is located in Salmon-Challis National Forest in Custer County.

References 

Mountains of Custer County, Idaho
Mountains of Idaho
Salmon-Challis National Forest